Nahit or NAHIT may refer to:
 Nahit (Russian word), see chickpea
 NAHIT, National Alliance for Health Information Technology, see RHIO